Huntsville Water Aerodrome  is located  west of Huntsville, Ontario, Canada.

See also
Huntsville/Bella Lake Water Aerodrome
Huntsville/Deerhurst Resort Airport

References

Registered aerodromes in Ontario
Transport in Huntsville, Ontario
Seaplane bases in Ontario